The following is a summary of Armagh county football team's 2020 season. The season was suspended in March 2020 due to the COVID-19 pandemic. The season resumed in mid-October of the same year.

Competitions

Dr McKenna Cup

The draw for the 2020 Dr McKenna Cup was made on 4 December 2019.

Table

Ranking of section runners-up

Reports

National Football League Division 2

Armagh competed in Division Two for the 2020 National League season. Fixtures were published by the GAA on 26 November 2019.

On 12 March 2020 the GAA suspended the National League in mid-March due to the COVID-19 pandemic. Games resumed in October 2020.

Fixtures

Table

Reports

Ulster Senior Football Championship

The draw for the 2020 Ulster Senior Football Championship took place on 9 October 2019.

Fixtures

Bracket

Reports

All-Ireland Senior Football Championship

Due to the impact of the COVID-19 pandemic on Gaelic games, the GAA announced that there would be no back-door route into the All-Ireland Championship. Therefore, because Armagh did not win the Ulster Championship, they did not qualify for the 2020 All-Ireland Championship.

Notes

References

Armagh
Gaelic
Armagh county football team seasons